Jeff Stilson (born c. 1959) is an American stand-up comedian, writer and TV producer.

Stilson was born in Spokane, WA. He began his stand up career in Seattle, WA in the mid 1980s. As a stand up he has appeared on Late Night with David Letterman, The Tonight Show, Comedy Central, The Late Late Show with Craig Ferguson, and was a regular guest on The Panel in Australia. He has also won two Emmy awards and received 14 nominations as a comedy writer and producer. Stilson was one of five comedians to appear on the 14th Annual Young Comedians Special for HBO in 1991.  He worked as a writer for The Late Show with David Letterman, and as a producer and writer for The Chris Rock Show, Da Ali G Show, Last Comic Standing and The Daily Show, and many others.

Stilson is friends with Chris Rock and worked with him to make the documentary Good Hair, receiving a nomination for the Writers Guild of America Award for Best Documentary Screenplay.

References

External links 

 

1950s births
Living people
American stand-up comedians
Emmy Award winners